Mions is a commune in the Metropolis of Lyon in Auvergne-Rhône-Alpes region in eastern France. The residents of the city are called Miolands and Miolandes.

Population

See also
Communes of the Metropolis of Lyon

External links 
official website

References

Communes of Lyon Metropolis
Dauphiné